How Do I Survive may refer to:

 "How Do I Survive" (Amy Holland song)
 "How Do I Survive?" (Superfly song)